A Wife to be Let (also spelled A Wife to be Lett) is a 1723 comedy play by the British writer Eliza Haywood. Better known for her novels, it was Haywood's first theatrical play.

Staged at the Drury Lane Theatre the cast included Theophilus Cibber as Toywell, William Wilks as Sir Harry Beaumont, Roger Bridgewater as Captain Gaylove, James Oates as Courtly and John Harper as Shamble. Haywood herself played the part of the wife Mrs Graspall, due to an illness of the original actress.

References

Bibliography
 Burling, William J. A Checklist of New Plays and Entertainments on the London Stage, 1700-1737. Fairleigh Dickinson Univ Press, 1992.
 Nicoll, Allardyce. History of English Drama, 1660-1900, Volume 2. Cambridge University Press, 2009.

1723 plays
West End plays
Plays by Eliza Haywood
Comedy plays